Nogometni klub Čelik Zenica is a professional football club based in Zenica, Bosnia and Herzegovina. The name Čelik means Steel in Bosnian and it symbolizes the strength and power of the club in an industrial city well-known for steel production. Throughout its history, the club has been known for the excellent support of its fans at its Bilino Polje stadium which hosts the Bosnian national team.

NK Čelik is one of the most prominent and successful football teams in Bosnia and Herzegovina being one of only two Bosnian clubs to win the national championship three times in a row – from 1994 to 1997. The club also won two national cups in a row – from 1995 to 1996. During the time of the former Yugoslavia, Čelik had played 17 seasons in the Yugoslav First League. Čelik won the Mitropa Cup two times, and was joint winner of the UEFA Intertoto Cup once.

In addition, Čelik is the only fan-owned football club in Bosnia & Herzegovina where club members democratically elect its leadership.

Today, Čelik is active in the Second League of FBIH having previously played in the Premier League of Bosnia and Herzegovina before getting relegated in the 2019–20 Bosnian Premier League season to the First League of the Federation of Bosnia and Herzegovina. In order to stabilise the club due to financial difficulties, its General Assembly voted to continue competing in the fourth tier-League of Zenica-Doboj Canton on 13 July 2020. The club advanced from the Cantonal league to the Second league of FBiH for the 2021–22 season.

History
The club had been founded on 16 June 1945 by a group of World War II veterans. The name of the club had been proposed by one of the founders, Zdenko Mazanek, to symbolize the strength of the club and its link to the workers of the city's metallurgic industry.

Club culture
Over the years, the club developed a strong identification with its hometown, Zenica, becoming one of its symbols. The club has produced many important international players including Elvir Bolić, Mirsad Hibić and Mladen Krstajić.

Grounds

Čelik plays their home games at the Bilino Polje stadium which is also the biggest stadium in the city. Over the years the club had changed four different stadiums settling at their current ground in 1972.

During the first few years of the club's existence, following World War II, Čelik's stadium was located roughly on the place of the current Bilino Polje stadium, close to the Bosna river. The ground was covered in clay, as was the practice of lower-level football grounds at the time. The stadium itself had one wooden stand which was built over time and the club often played in front of full capacity.

However, due to the increased popularity of the club and the need for a better surface, during the early 1950s the club moved to the nearby Stadion Blatuša which was located in the Blatuša neighborhood of Zenica. It was there that Čelik started its first run of successes when they had reached promotion to the Yugoslav First League in 1966 and won the Mitropa Cup in 1971 (the final was played on neutral ground in Gorizia, Italy).

Shortly after the first Mitropa Cup victory, plans were made for a new, modern stadium, built in place of Čelik's first stadium. The construction took 8 months to complete and it was officially opened on 4 October 1972 for the second leg of the 1972 Mitropa Cup final against Fiorentina which Čelik won 1–0 to claim their second title in a row. The attendance record of 35,000 still stands today due to the introduction of seats on the stadium over the years. The stadium went through a number of renovations and reconstructions, the most recent being in 2012.

From July to August 2012, the stadium went through another renovation process where the pitch had been changed and under-soil heating installed beneath. During the reconstruction, Čelik played two Bosnian Premier League matches as well as one Bosnian Cup match on the Stadion Kamberovića Polje, winning all of them. In the second part of the same season, the club played one more game there which ended in a draw.

The youth squads of Čelik usually play their games at the smaller stadium Kamberovića Polje.

Supporters

The ultras supporter group of Čelik, established in 1988 in Zenica, is called Robijaši (The Convicts in English) because Zenica is famous for its prison. Widely known for their fanatic support, they have been fighting to preserve the club and support it through difficult financial times.

Honours

Domestic

League
First League of Bosnia and Herzegovina:
 Winners (3): 1994–95, 1995–96, 1996–97
Yugoslav Second League:
 Winners (4): 1965–66 , 1978–79 , 1982–83 , 1984–85 
League of Zenica-Doboj Canton:
 Winners (1): 2020–21

Cups
Bosnia and Herzegovina Cup:
 Winners (2): 1994–95, 1995–96
 Runners-up (2): 2010–11, 2013–14

European
UEFA Intertoto Cup:
Winners (1): 1975 (Joint Winner)
Mitropa Cup:
Winners (2): 1970–71, 1971–72
 Runners-up (2): 1972–73, 1979–80

Recent seasons

European record

P = Matches played; W = Matches won; D = Matches drawn; L = Matches lost; GF = Goals for; GA = Goals against; GD = Goals difference. Defunct competitions indicated in italics.

List of matches

Players

Current squad

Players with multiple nationalities
 Adis Nurković

Club officials

Other information

Notable managers

Notes

References

External links

NK Čelik Zenica on Facebook
Čelik at UEFA.com

 
Association football clubs established in 1945
Football clubs in Bosnia and Herzegovina
Sport in the Federation of Bosnia and Herzegovina
Football clubs in Yugoslavia
Sport in Zenica
1945 establishments in Bosnia and Herzegovina